Gary Lofts (born 5 October 1951) is  a former Australian rules footballer who played with St Kilda in the Victorian Football League (VFL).

Notes

External links 
		

Living people
1951 births
Australian rules footballers from Victoria (Australia)
St Kilda Football Club players
Beaufort Football Club players